The Landau kinetic equation is a transport equation of weakly coupled charged particles performing Coulomb collisions in a plasma.

The equation was derived by Lev Landau in 1936 as an alternative to the Boltzmann equation in the case of Coulomb interaction. When used with the Vlasov equation, the equation yields the time evolution for collisional plasma, hence it is considered a staple kinetic model in the theory of collisional plasma.

Overview

Definition 
Let  be a one-particle Distribution function. the equation reads:

The right-hand side of the equation is known as the Landau collision integral (in parallel to the Boltzmann collision integral).

 is obtained by integrating over the intermolecular potential :

For many intermolecular potentials (most notably power laws where ), the expression for  diverges. Landau's solution to this problem is to introduce Cutoffs at small and large angles.

Uses 
The equation is used primarily in Statistical mechanics and Particle physics to model plasma. As such, it has been used to model and study Plasma in thermonuclear reactors. It has also seen use in modeling of Active matter .

The equation and its properties have been studied in depth by Alexander Bobylev.

Derivations 
The first derivation was given in Landau's original paper. The rough idea for the derivation: 

The potential  is then plugged it into the Boltzmann collision integral (the collision term of the Boltzmann equation) and solved for the main asymptotic term in the limit .

In 1946, the first formal derivation of the equation from the BBGKY hierarchy was published by Nikolay Bogolyubov.

The Fokker-Planck-Landau equation 
In 1957, the equation was derived independently by Marshall Rosenbluth. Solving the Fokker–Planck equation under an inverse-square force, one may obtain:

where  are the Rosenbluth potentials:

for 
The Fokker-Planck representation of the equation is primarily used for its convenience in numerical modeling and calculations.

The Fokker-Planck representation of the equation is primarily used for its convenience in numerical calculations.

The relativistic Landau kinetic equation 
A relativistic version of the equation was published in 1956 by Gersh Budker and Spartak Belyaev.

Considering relativistic particles with momentum  and energy , the equation reads:

where the kernel is given by  such that:

A relativistic correction to the equation is relevant seeing as particle in hot plasma often reach relativistic speeds.

See also 

 List of plasma physics articles
 Boltzmann equation
 Vlasov equation

References 

Equations of physics
Quantum mechanics
Lev Landau